Aux Rochers River (Rocky River), is a river in Sept-Rivières Regional County Municipality, Côte-Nord, Quebec, Canada.
It is a tributary of the Gulf of Saint Lawrence

Description

The Aux Rochers River is in Port-Cartier, Sept-Rivières.
It empties into the Gulf of Saint Lawrence in the town of Port-Cartier.
One of its tributaries, the Gravel River, is sometimes also called the Aux Rochers River.
The Gravel flows south to the long Lake Walker.
The Aux Rochers River proper leaves the south end of Lake Walker and flows southeast for a further .
The river is hard to navigate due to a strong current. It also contains many rocks, hence its name. Some of the smaller rocks move to different places in the river each year.

The lower river valley is used by southern section of the Cartier Railway, which then runs along the east shore of Lake Quatre Lieues before following the valley of the MacDonald River, a tributary of the Aux Rochers.

Environment

A map of the Ecological regions of Quebec shows the river rising and flowing south through the eastern spruce/moss domain of the boreal zone.
The last section of the river flows through the fir/white birch domain of the boreal zone.

River basin

It is bordered by the Sainte-Marguerite River basin to the east, the Pentecôte River basin to the west, and to the north by the Manicouagan integrated management region.
The lower part of the river basin is bordered by the basin of the Dominique River to the east.

A highly dissected rocky plateau covers the remainder of the watershed.
It has steep slopes that may rise for several hundred meters from the valley floors.

The bedrock of the southern half of the watershed is relatively undeformed migmatite, a magmatic rock.
The northern half has metamorphic rocks of magmatic and sedimentary origin, such as gneisses and paragneisses. 
The plateau and hills generally have thin soil with large areas of rocky outcroppings.
The coastal plain has large quantities of clay and silt sediments deposited when the Goldthwait Sea invaded after the retreat of the Laurentide Ice Sheet. 
When that sea in turn retreated it left a covering of coarse sandy estuarine and deltaic sediments.

Rivers

On the coastal plain the Aux Rochers River meanders slightly, then follows a rectilinear course where it has cut into the layer of glaciomarine sediments.

The main tributaries are the Gravel, Schmon, Pasteur and MacDonald.
Generally the rivers have angular courses, since their valleys follow the network of fractures of the bedrock.
However, some rivers meander through their alluvial sediments in wide valleys in the center of the watershed.

Lakes

There are many large lakes on the plateau and in the foothills.
There are two other elongated lakes in the southern part of the basin.
In total, lakes cover 8.46% of the watershed.
Wetlands cover 0.71% of watershed, mainly on the coastal plain with its flat relief and fine sediments.

Large lakes include:

Lake Walker

Since 2006 it has been proposed to establish the Lake Walker National Park within the wildlife sanctuary, surrounding Lake Walker. 
As of May 2019 the project was stalled for lack of funding.

As a visitor attraction

The river is popular for fishing, containing various species including salmon. Large salmon are known to migrate through the river. On June 24, 2013, the Association de protection de la rivière Aux Rochers reported that, during counting of migrating fish through the counting facility, of the 20 fish counted, many were MSW (multi sea winter) salmon weighing over 25 pounds.

Aux Rochers River is also considered to be a scenic place and tourist destination as it has various areas of rapids and small falls.

Conservation

There are two protected areas that cover 14.3% of the watershed combined. 
It was created in 2005, and is an exceptional forest ecosystem of IUCN category III. 
This is an IUCN III category area, and encompasses Pasteur Lake and almost all of Walker Lake.
90.3% of the watershed is contained in the Port-Cartier–Sept-Îles Wildlife Reserve.

In May 2015 the Ministry of Forests, Wildlife and Parks of Quebec announced a sport fishing catch-and-release program for large salmon on sixteen of Quebec's 118 salmon rivers.
These were the Mitis, Laval, Pigou, Bouleau, Aux Rochers, Jupitagon, Magpie, Saint-Jean, Corneille, Piashti, Watshishou, Little Watshishou, Nabisipi, Aguanish and Natashquan rivers.
The Quebec Atlantic Salmon Federation said that the measures did not go nearly far enough in protecting salmon for future generations.
In view of the rapidly declining Atlantic salmon population catch-and-release should have been implemented on all rivers apart from northern Quebec.

References

Citations

External links
 Association for the protection of the Aux Rochers River

Rivers of Côte-Nord
Tributaries of the Saint Lawrence River